was a king the Ryukyu Kingdom, who ruled from 1710 to 1712.

It was said that he was born with harelip, which made his grandfather Shō Tei worry. A Ryukyuan named Takamine Tokumei met a Chinese doctor Huang Huiyou in Fuzhou. Huang taught Takamine how to repair a cleft palate. Takamine came back to Ryukyu in 1688, and had the Prince's lip repaired in the next year.

Shō Eki succeeded his grandfather Shō Tei as king in 1710, and died two years later.

References
高嶺徳明顕彰碑文
魏姓家譜（慶佐次家）

Kings of Ryūkyū
Second Shō dynasty
1678 births
1712 deaths